is a Japanese professional boxer who has held the WBO flyweight title from 2020 to 2022. As of July 2022, he is ranked as the world's best active flyweight by The Ring, second by ESPN and BoxRec, and third by the Transnational Boxing Rankings Board.

Professional career

Flyweight

Early career
Nakatani made his professional debut on 26 April 2015, scoring a first-round technical knockout (TKO) victory over Junichi Itoga at the Industrial Hall in Gifu, Japan. He would go on to amass a 9-0 record, and was ranked in the flyweight rankings by the JBC following his victory over Masamichi Yabuki.

Nakatani was scheduled to fight Atiwit Munyapho on February 19, 2017, in the opening round of the Japanese flyweight Youth Tournament. He won the fight by a second-round technical knockout. He beat Joel Taduran by a fourth-round technical knockout and Yuma Kudo by majority decision over the next two rounds, before facing Seigo Yuri Akui in the tournament finals. He beat Akui by a sixth-round technical knockout. He was further named the tournament MVP.

Nakatani won his next four fights, before being scheduled to fight Naoki Mochizuki for the vacant Japanese flyweight title. He won the fight by a ninth-round technical knockout. He fought Philip Luis Cuerdo on June 1, 2019, and won the fight by a first-round knockout.

On July 23, 2019, Nakatani vacated the Japanese flyweight title.

Nakatani was scheduled to fight the former IBF and IBO light flyweight champion Milan Melindo on October 5, 2019. He beat Melindo by a sixth-round technical knockout.

Nakatani vs. Magramo
Nakatani was scheduled to fight Giemel Magramo for the vacant WBO flyweight title on 6 November 2020 at the Korakuen Hall. The bout was originally set for April but due to the COVID-19 pandemic was postponed and rescheduled thrice. Nakatani entered the bout as the favorite to win the title. Nakatani dominated the bout, punishing his opponent from range, and landing with more power when Magramo closed in. Nakatani won the fight by an eight-round technical knockout. The referee waved the fight off early on in the round, as Magramo was knocked down with a combination of punches, although Magramo managed to beat the count.

Nakatani vs. Acosta
Nakatani was scheduled to make his first title defense against the former WBO light flyweight champion Ángel Acosta on May 29, 2021, in his native Japan. Increasingly strict COVID-19 regulations imposed by the Japanese government and international travel issues forced the postponement of the bout, with Nakatani's management tentatively announcing the fight for late May or early June. On May 26, 2021, WBO scheduled a June 1st purse bid with a minimum offer of $80,000. That purse bid was canceled on June 2, 2021, as an agreement was made that Nakatani’s promoter, Teiken Promotions, would handle the negotiations. The fight was scheduled for September 10, 2021, in Tucson, Arizona. Nakatani won the fight by a fourth-round technical knockout. Nakatani broke Acosta's nose in the opening round of the bout, and both the referee and the ringside physician warned Acosta that the fight would be stopped if his nose suffered more damage. The fight was finally stopped near the end of the fourth round, at the 2:28 minute mark.

Nakatani vs. Yamauchi
Nakatani was booked to make his second WBO flyweight title defense against the reigning WBO Asia Pacific flyweight titleholder Ryota Yamauchi on April 9, 2022. The bout was scheduled for the undercard of the Ryota Murata and Gennadiy Golovkin middleweight unification bout, and took place at the Saitama Super Arena in Saitama, Japan. He won the fight by an eight-round technical knockout, forcing referee Katsuhiko Nakamura to stop the bout with a flurry of punches at the 2:20 minute mark. Nakatani was leading on the scorecards at the time of the stoppage, with all three judges' having him up 70–63.

Super flyweight

Nakatani vs. Rodríguez Jr.
Nakatani is going to face the former WBO super flyweight title challenger Francisco Rodríguez Jr. in a super flyweight bout on 1 November 2022. The fight took place on the undercard of the Hiroto Kyoguchi and Kenshiro Teraji title unification bout. Nakatani officially vacated his WBO flyweight title on 27 October. Nakatani won the fight by unanimous decision, with scores of 98–91, 97–92 and 99–90. Rodríguez Jr. was deducted a point in the seventh round for landing a low blow.

Nakatani vs. Moloney
On 1 January 2023, the reigning WBO super flyweight champion Kazuto Ioka was ordered by the sanctioning body to make a mandatory title defense against Nakatani. As Ioka vacated the title on 14 February to pursue a rematch with Joshua Franco, Nakatani was instead ordered to face Andrew Moloney for the vacant championship.

Professional boxing record

See also
List of world flyweight boxing champions
List of Japanese boxing world champions

References

External links

Living people
1998 births
Sportspeople from Mie Prefecture
Japanese male boxers
Flyweight boxers
Southpaw boxers
World flyweight boxing champions
World Boxing Organization champions